Jajang Sukmara (born 18 November 1988) simply known as Jasuk Is an Indonesian professional footballer who plays for Liga 1 club Dewa United.

Honours

Club
Persib Bandung U-17
 Soeratin Cup: 2006
Persib Bandung
 Indonesia Super League: 2014
 Indonesia President's Cup: 2015
Dewa United
 Liga 2 third place (play-offs): 2021

References

External links
 
 Jajang Sukmara at Liga Indonesia

1988 births
Living people
Sundanese people
People from Bandung
Sportspeople from West Java
Sportspeople from Bandung
Indonesian footballers
Indonesia youth international footballers
Persib Bandung players
PSMS Medan players
PS Barito Putera players
PSS Sleman players
PSCS Cilacap players
Dewa United F.C. players
Indonesian Premier Division players
Liga 1 (Indonesia) players
Liga 2 (Indonesia) players
Association football defenders
Indonesian Super League-winning players